The 2012 NCAA Division I FBS football season was the highest level of college football competition in the United States organized by the National Collegiate Athletic Association (NCAA).

The regular season began on August 30, 2012 and ended on December 8, 2012. The postseason concluded on January 7, 2013 with the BCS National Championship Game, where Alabama repeated as national champions by defeating Notre Dame.

Although Ohio State finished the regular season as the only undefeated team from an automatic-qualifying ("Power 5") BCS conference, they were ineligible to play in the postseason due to sanctions imposed earlier in the year.

Rule changes
The NCAA Rules Committee approved the following rule changes for the 2012 season, mostly for safety reasons:
 Kickoffs will be moved up to the 35-yard line from the 30, mirroring a similar change by the NFL in the 2011 season and rescinding a rule change made in the 2007 season.
 The kicking team will only have a five-yard running head start on kickoffs, again mirroring the NFL changes in 2011.
 Touchbacks will move from the 20-yard line to the 25-yard line only on kickoffs and free kicks after a safety. Touchbacks on punts rolling into the end zone, fumbles into the end zone, and interceptions in the end zone will remain at the 20-yard line.
 Players will be forbidden to leap over other players when blocking punts.
 Players who lose their helmets during a play (except when caused by fouls such as grabbing the facemask) will have to leave the field for one play. When a helmet is lost during play by the ball carrier, the play is dead immediately. Any action made by or against a helmetless player is penalized as a personal foul for 15 yards.
 Offensive players in the tackle box at the snap who are not in motion are allowed to block below the waist legally without restriction. All other players are restricted from blocking below the waist with some exceptions (i.e., blocking straight-on), modifying a rule change from the 2011 season.

Conference realignment

Membership changes
The following list includes schools transitioning from FCS to FBS.

On March 7, Temple was admitted back into the Big East Conference after having been expelled from it a decade earlier for failing to maintain a competitive football program. Temple joined from the Mid-American Conference, where it had competed since 2007.

Teams transitioning to FBS
On April 9, 2012, Georgia State University, a member of the Colonial Athletic Association, announced that it would rejoin the Sun Belt Conference effective in July 2013. Georgia State had been a charter Sun Belt member when the conference formed in 1976, but left in 1981. The Panthers began their FBS transition during the 2012 season and started playing a full Sun Belt schedule upon joining the conference in 2013. Full FBS membership, along with bowl eligibility, followed in 2014. The Panthers, who had been coached by Bill Curry since starting a football program in 2010, played home games at the Georgia Dome near the school's campus in downtown Atlanta. The Panthers remained at the Georgia Dome until its closure and demolition after the 2016 season; they have since taken over the venue formerly known as Centennial Olympic Stadium and Turner Field and converted it into the football-specific venue originally known as Georgia State Stadium and now as Center Parc Stadium.

Georgia State followed four other schools that were in the second and final years of FBS transitions— UMass, South Alabama, Texas State, and UTSA.

Future changes 
The conference realignment period that began in 2010 continued for a third consecutive off-season.

The Mountain West Conference continued to raid the rapidly-collapsing Western Athletic Conference by adding San Jose State and Utah State on May 4. The additions allowed the Mountain West, which was anticipating the looming departures of Boise State and San Diego State to the Big East, to keep its football membership at ten teams for the 2013 season.

On September 12, the Atlantic Coast Conference (ACC) announced the addition of Notre Dame in all sports except football. Under the agreement, Notre Dame's football team would play five games against ACC opponents per season but remain classified an FBS independent, while its other sports would be fully integrated into the ACC. The arrangement is effectively a stronger version of the affiliation Notre Dame had had with the Big East since 1995.

The Big Ten Conference, having already added Nebraska in 2011, admitted two more schools to expand the conference's geographic footprint to the East Coast. Maryland, coming from the ACC, was announced as the 13th member on November 19, followed by Rutgers of the Big East as the 14th member on November 21. Both moves would take effect during the 2014–15 academic year.

To keep its football membership at an even number, the ACC added Louisville on November 28 as a replacement for departing Maryland.

Updated stadiums

Expanded stadiums
Boise State moved their track and field program out of Bronco Stadium, allowing for the expansion of end zone bleachers over the existing track. The new permanent additions increased capacity from 33,500 to 37,000.
Nebraska continued its expansion of Memorial Stadium that would push its capacity beyond 90,000.
TCU completed a major renovation of Amon G. Carter Stadium. Seating capacity increased only by about 600 seats to 45,000.
Texas State nearly doubled the size of Bobcat Stadium as part of its FBS transition. The venue, which formerly contained about 16,000 seats, now holds 30,000.

Renovated stadiums
California returned to California Memorial Stadium following major renovations, which included a full seismic retrofit, as the stadium is located directly on a major fault. The stadium's capacity was reduced from 71,800 to 62,700. The Golden Bears played their 2011 home schedule at AT&T Park in San Francisco, and also played what was officially a neutral-site game against Fresno State at Candlestick Park, also in San Francisco.
Clemson renovated the video systems at Clemson Memorial Stadium prior to the start of the 2012 season. A new Jumbotron was installed on the primary scoreboard behind the East endzone, while two smaller video boards were installed on each side of the WestZone stands. In addition, video ribbons were installed along the facings of the upper decks.
Michigan State completed a complete overhaul of their sound and video system with the addition of two video boards in the north end zone, a video ribbon along the entire north edge and installation of the fourth largest scoreboard in the NCAA in the south end zone.

Temporary stadiums
 Due to major renovations at Husky Stadium, Washington played its entire 2012 home schedule at nearby CenturyLink Field, home to the Seattle Seahawks (NFL) and Seattle Sounders FC (MLS).
 Due to renovations at Warren McGuirk Alumni Stadium, Massachusetts played its entire 2012 home schedule at Gillette Stadium, home to the New England Patriots (NFL) and New England Revolution (MLS). The school is also contractually obligated to play all of its 2013 home schedule, plus at least four home games in each season from 2014 to 2016, at Gillette, which is approximately a 2-hour drive from the UMass campus.

Regular season top 10 matchups
Rankings reflect the AP Poll. Rankings for Week 8 and beyond will list BCS Rankings first and AP Poll second. Teams that failed to be a top 10 team for one poll or the other will be noted.
Week 1
No. 2 Alabama defeated No. 8 Michigan, 41–14 (Cowboys Stadium, Arlington, Texas)
Week 4
No. 4 Florida State defeated No. 10 Clemson, 49–37 (Doak Campbell Stadium, Tallahassee, Florida)
Week 6
No. 6 South Carolina defeated No. 5 Georgia, 35–7 (Williams–Brice Stadium, Columbia, South Carolina)
No. 10 Florida defeated No. 4 LSU, 14–6 (Ben Hill Griffin Stadium, Gainesville, Florida)
Week 7
No. 9 LSU defeated No. 3 South Carolina, 23–21 (Tiger Stadium, Baton Rouge, Louisiana)
Week 8
No. 2/3 Florida defeated No. 7/9 South Carolina, 44–11 (Ben Hill Griffin Stadium, Gainesville, Florida)
Week 9
No. 5/5 Notre Dame defeated No. 8/8 Oklahoma, 30–13 (Oklahoma Memorial Stadium, Norman, Oklahoma)
No. 10/12 Georgia defeated No. 2/3 Florida, 17–9 (EverBank Field, Jacksonville, Florida)
Week 10
No. 1/1 Alabama defeated No. 5/5 LSU, 21–17 (Tiger Stadium, Baton Rouge, Louisiana)
Week 13
No. 4/6 Florida defeated No. 10/10 Florida State, 37–26 (Doak Campbell Stadium, Tallahassee, Florida)
Week 14
No. 2/2 Alabama defeated No. 3/3 Georgia, 32–28 (2012 SEC Championship Game, Georgia Dome, Atlanta, Georgia)

Conference standings

Conference summaries
Rankings reflect the Week 14 AP Poll before the games were played.

Conference championship games

Other conference champions

* Received conference's automatic BCS bowl bid.

Final BCS rankings

Despite not being in the BCS rankings, Wisconsin (8–5) played in the Rose Bowl by virtue of being the Big Ten Champion.

Bowl games

Bowl Championship Series

Other bowl games

Bowl Challenge Cup standings

Awards and honors

Heisman Trophy
The Heisman Trophy is given to the year's most outstanding player.

Other major awards
Archie Griffin Award (MVP): Johnny Manziel, Texas A&M
AP Player of the Year: Johnny Manziel, Texas A&M
Chic Harley Award (Player of the Year): Johnny Manziel, Texas A&M
Maxwell Award (top player): Manti Te'o, Notre Dame
SN Player of the Year: Johnny Manziel, Texas A&M
Walter Camp Award (top player): Manti Te'o, Notre Dame

Special awards
Burlsworth Trophy (top player who began as walk-on): Matt McGloin, Penn State
Paul Hornung Award (most versatile player): Tavon Austin, West Virginia
Campbell Trophy ("academic Heisman"): Barrett Jones, Alabama
Wuerffel Trophy (humanitarian-athlete): Matt Barkley, USC

Offense

Quarterback 
Davey O'Brien Award (quarterback): Johnny Manziel, Texas A&M
Johnny Unitas Award (senior/4th year quarterback): Collin Klein, Kansas State
Kellen Moore Award (quarterback): Collin Klein, Kansas State
Manning Award (quarterback): Johnny Manziel, Texas A&M
Sammy Baugh Trophy (quarterback, specifically passer): Colby Cameron, Louisiana Tech

Running back 
Doak Walker Award (running back): Montee Ball, Wisconsin
Jim Brown Trophy (running back): Montee Ball, Wisconsin

Wide receiver 
Fred Biletnikoff Award (wide receiver): Marqise Lee, USC
 Paul Warfield Trophy (wide receiver): Marqise Lee, USC

Tight end 
John Mackey Award (tight end): Tyler Eifert, Notre Dame

Lineman 
Dave Rimington Trophy (center): Barrett Jones, Alabama
Outland Trophy (interior lineman): Luke Joeckel, Texas A&M

Defense
Bronko Nagurski Trophy (defensive player): Manti Te'o, Notre Dame
Chuck Bednarik Award (defensive player): Manti Te'o, Notre Dame
Lott Trophy (defensive impact): Manti Te'o, Notre Dame

Defensive line 
Bill Willis Award (defensive lineman): John Simon, Ohio State
Dick Butkus Award (linebacker): Manti Te'o, Notre Dame
Jack Lambert Trophy (linebacker): Jarvis Jones, Georgia
Lombardi Award (defensive lineman): Manti Te'o, Notre Dame
Ted Hendricks Award (defensive end): Jadeveon Clowney, South Carolina

Defensive back 
Jim Thorpe Award (defensive back): Johnthan Banks, Mississippi State

Special teams
Lou Groza Award (placekicker): Cairo Santos, Tulane
Ray Guy Award (punter): Ryan Allen, Louisiana Tech

Coaches
AP Coach of the Year: Brian Kelly, Notre Dame
Bobby Bowden National Collegiate Coach of the Year Award: Nick Saban, Alabama
Bobby Dodd Coach of the Year Award: Bill Snyder, Kansas State
Eddie Robinson Coach of the Year: Brian Kelly, Notre Dame
Maxwell Coach of the Year: Bill O'Brien, Penn State
Paul "Bear" Bryant Award: Bill O'Brien, Penn State
SN Coach of the Year: Brian Kelly, Notre Dame
The Home Depot Coach of the Year Award: Brian Kelly, Notre Dame
Woody Hayes Trophy: Urban Meyer, Ohio State
Walter Camp Coach of the Year: Brian Kelly, Notre Dame

Assistants 
AFCA Assistant Coach of the Year: Kirby Smart, Alabama
Broyles Award: Bob Diaco, Notre Dame

All-Americans

Records

 The FBS record for most consecutive passes attempted from the start of a season with no interceptions, previously set by Trent Dilfer of Fresno State in 1993, was broken twice on October 20:
 First, in a day game, Geno Smith of West Virginia set a new mark of 273 before throwing his first interception in a 55–14 loss to Kansas State.
 In a night game, Colby Cameron of Louisiana Tech surpassed that record in the Bulldogs' 70–28 win over Idaho, ending the game at 275 attempts in the season without an interception.
 On November 10, Cameron broke Russell Wilson's FBS career record for most consecutive passes attempted without an interception (379) in Louisiana Tech's 62–55 win over Texas State. Cameron's interception-free streak ended one week later in the second quarter of the Bulldogs' 48–41 overtime loss to Utah State. His single-season streak ended at 428 attempts, and his overall record, which included pass attempts in the 2011 Poinsettia Bowl, ended at 444.
 In the same game in which Cameron broke Wilson's no-interceptions mark, his teammate, running back Kenneth Dixon, set three single-season FBS freshman records:
 Dixon finished the game with 25 total touchdowns, breaking the record of 23 set by Marshall Faulk of San Diego State in 1991. He finished the season with 28 touchdowns (the Bulldogs did not play in a bowl despite a 9–3 record).
 Of those 25 touchdowns, 24 were on the ground, breaking the previous record of 21 rushing touchdowns set by Faulk and equaled in 2009 by Ryan Williams of Virginia Tech. Dixon ended the season with 27 rushing TDs.
 Dixon ended the game with 150 points on the season, breaking Faulk's previous record of 140. He ended the season with 168 points.
 On November 24, Wisconsin running back Montee Ball scored his 79th career touchdown during the Badgers' 24–21 loss to Penn State, breaking the previous record of Miami (OH) running back Travis Prentice.
 In the Big Ten Championship Game on December 1, Ball added to his collection of FBS records. In the Badgers' 70–31 win over Nebraska, he scored three touchdowns, all on the ground. Ball, who had entered the game tied with Prentice for the most FBS career rushing touchdowns, took sole possession of the record, ending the game with 76. He also tied Prentice's FBS record for most career games with multiple touchdowns, at 25.

Coaching changes
This list is restricted to coaching changes that took place on or after May 1, 2012. For coaching changes that occurred earlier in 2012, see 2011 NCAA Division I FBS end-of-season coaching changes.

Preseason and in-season

End of season

TV ratings

Most watched regular season games in 2012

Note(*): Games rate in the top six most watched games of the last 20 years.

Note(**): Rankings reflect AP Poll Standings. (All others rankings reflect BCS Standings at the time of the game)

See also

 2012 NCAA Division I FBS football rankings

References

External links